Guns is the name of the 1992 EP by the experimental music and sound collage band Negativland. It was released as a replacement for their deleted/withdrawn EP "U2". The cover art reuses that which appears on "U2". The album is about the appeal of guns and their place in American history. "Then" includes samples from western movies and radio shows of the 1940s and 1950s, mixed with audio from the film Son of the Morning Star. "Now" samples 1980s and 1990s commercials which marketed guns to women, mixed with the original radio reports from the John F. Kennedy assassination and Robert F. Kennedy assassination.

Track listings
 "Then" - 8:05
 "Now" - 8:36

Notes
The back of the EP has a tongue-in-cheek letter to U2 regarding the infamous "U2" Incident:

1992 EPs
Negativland EPs
Sound collage albums